The Cattaraugus Cutlery Company began as the New York distribution company J.B.F. Champlin and Son, founded by John Brown Francis Champlin and his son Tint in 1882. The Champlins expanded into knife production, and along with William R. Case and his brothers, they formed Cattaraugus Cutlery in 1886, based in Little Valley. The company hired expert cutlers from Germany, England, and other U.S. manufacturers, to produce high quality cutlery, and purchased knife-making equipment from the defunct Beaver Falls Cutlery Company. Admiral Byrd selected Cattaraugus knives to take on his expedition to the South Pole.

Over time, the Case family separated from Cattaraugus to form W. R. Case & Sons Cutlery Co., incorporated in 1905. Cattaraugus closed business in 1963. Two separate fires destroyed the building in August 2015 and August 2016; it had stood for several decades vacant (another business occupied the factory's office building, which remains standing, for a time in the 1970s) and had fallen into severe disrepair by the time of the first fire.

Notes

References
Case History. Case Pocket Knives. 2002. Retrieved 2008-04-22.
"Take Cattaraugus" Explorers Advised Admiral Byrd. Advertisement. Cattaraugus Cutlery Company. 
Place, Rich (August 7, 2015). "Former Cattaraugus Cutlery Co. building goes up in flames." Salamanca Press. Retrieved August 8, 2015.

Further reading
Ritchie, Roy and Ron Stewart. Cattaraugus Cutlery Co.: Identification and Values. Collector Books. 1999. 

Knife manufacturing companies
Companies based in Cattaraugus County, New York
Manufacturing companies established in 1886
Manufacturing companies disestablished in 1963
1886 establishments in New York (state)
1963 disestablishments in New York (state)
Defunct manufacturing companies based in New York (state)